Lene Espedal (born 11 January 1983) is a retired Norwegian football midfielder.

She played junior football for Sandved IL and made her senior debut Klepp IL in 1999. After a spell in Kolbotn IL she rejoined Klepp before retiring after the 2008 season.

She won her sole cap for the Norway women's national football team in the 2004 Algarve Cup. A prolific youth international, she was a squad member for the 2002 UEFA Women's Under-19 Championship.

References

1983 births
Living people
People from Sandnes
Norwegian women's footballers
Klepp IL players
Kolbotn Fotball players
Toppserien players
Norway women's youth international footballers
Norway women's international footballers
Women's association football midfielders
Sportspeople from Rogaland